The Ligbi (or Ligby) people speak a Mande language in Ghana, in the north-west corner of the Brong-Ahafo Region. Ligbi is spoken by approximately 10,000 speakers (1988 GILLBT/SIL). It is fairly closely related to Jula, Vai and Kono. A small population of Ligbi speakers (around 4,000) is reported to live in Ivory Coast (Vanderaa 1991). Ligbi is also known as Wela (Hwela) or Numu. The latter of these refers to a subsection of the Ligbi people;  is Dyula for 'blacksmith'. (See blacksmiths of western Africa.)

The Ligbi area in Ghana is bordered to the west by Nafaanra, the Senufo language of the Nafana people. The Ligbi people have come to the area of Begho (Bighu), an ancient trading town on the Tain river in Ghana, in the early 17th century before the Nafana. 
Ligbi has seven oral and seven nasal vowels. It is a tonal language with two level tones, High and Low. Syllables are of the form (C1)V(C2) or N (a syllabic nasal), where CV is the most common syllable type.  C1 can be any of the consonants, whereas the optional C2 slot can have only nasals homorganic with the following consonants, e.g.,  "nine houses,"  "ten houses." V (a vowel) alone occurs word-initial only in personal pronouns, some loan words, and names, e.g.,  "we have come."

Notes

References
Persson, Andrew and Janet (1976) 'Ligbi', in Mary Esther Kropp Dakubu (ed.) West African Linguistic Data Sheets, vol 1.

Mande languages
Languages of Ghana
Blacksmiths